Weisenborn is a surname of German origin, originating as a habitational name for someone from any of numerous places named Weissenborn. Notable people with the surname include:

Clara Weisenborn (1907-1985), American politician
Gordon Weisenborn (1923-1987), American director, producer, writer, and cinematographer
Günther Weisenborn (1902-1969), German writer and resistance fighter
Rudolph Weisenborn (1881-1974), American artist

See also
Weissenborn, a brand of lap slide guitar